Clifford Davis (23 April 1900 – 19 October 1974) was a track and field athlete who competed in the 800m and 1500m at the 1924 Summer Olympics.

References

External links
 

1900 births
1974 deaths
South African male middle-distance runners
Athletes (track and field) at the 1924 Summer Olympics
Olympic athletes of South Africa